The Romay family (Spanish: Casa de Romay) is a Spanish aristocratic family that descends from 8th-century pre-Reconquista Galicia, in northern Spain. According to historians, the family descends from Román de Romae, Count of Monterroso and Santa María de Ortigueira, a natural grandson of King Alfonso I the Catholic. 

The current head of the family is Don Ricardo de Romay y Hernandez-Chazaro, 47th Señor de Cadro and Monterroso.

Origins 
The indisputable line can be traced from the 13th-century records that coincide with the edification of the main family seat, the Palace of Cadro (Galician: Pazo do Cadro), in Marín, Pontevedra, Galicia. This is the oldest pazo in that region.

History 

The Romay family is distinguished by its multiple alliances with noble families, such as Sarmiento de Valladares, Suárez de Deza, Saavedra, Mendoza, Montenegro, Ulloa, Varela, Fernández de Córdoba, Duque de Estrada, Osorio de Moscoso and Sotomayor.

Notable members:

 Don Jose Sarmiento Valladares Arines de Romay (1643-1708), 1st Duke of Atrisco, 40th Viceroy of New Spain
 Don Juan de Romay, 18th Count of Monterroso, Lord of Cadro.
 Doña Antonia de Romay-Sotomayor y Varela-Ulloa, Countess of Villanueva de San Bernardo

 Doña Josefa de Romay y de España, Grandee of Spain, Baroness of Casa do Ria

 Don Alonso Enriquez Sarmiento Valladares y Romay (1700-1757) IV Marquess of Valladares, III Viscount Meira

 Doña Juana de la Torre de Romay-Sotomayor, II Marquesa de Bendaña

 Ramón Romay y Ximenez de Cisneros (1764 -1849), Captain General of the Spanish Navy and Director General of the same.
 José Alfonso Correa Cortés de Mendoza Ozores de Sotomayor y Romay, II count of Villanueva de San Bernardo, II viscount of Pegullal, etc.
 Don Teodosio de Romay, Count of Monterroso, Lord of Cadro
 Leonor Romay Yáñez-Sotomayor, Countess de la Torre Vilariño
 José Manuel Romay y Beccaria, Spanish politician.
 Tomas Romay y Chacon, doctor of the Royal Chamber and Knight Commander of the Order of Isabel la Católica.
 Don Diego de Romay, VIII Marquess of Camos, designer and architect.
 Doña María Romay Torrado, XVI Viscountess of La Pedreira
 Don Enrique de Romay y Piña, XLV Lord of Cadro.

 Don Ricardo de Romay y Wisbrun Chacon, XLVI Lord of Cadro and Monterroso, married to Doña Ofelia Hernandez-Chazaro Lemus de Mier, (a relative of Rainier III, Prince of Monaco on the Mier-Polignac line). 
 Don Ricardo de Romay y Hernandez-Chazaro (1951), XLVII Lord of Cadro and Monterroso, married Doña Marcela Basail Heredia von Habsburg-Lorraine (1951). They have four children: Don Narian de Romay-Basail (1976), Don Jesus R. de Romay-Basail (1978), Don Ricardo de Romay-Basail (1981) and Don Diego de Romay-Basail (1988).

Dominion and influence 

The best preserved registered settlement of the Romay family can be found in the archives of the 13th-century Pazo of Cadro, the original family seat in Marin, Pontevedra, where they would have exercised civil and criminal jurisdiction.  Marín's council archives document that “the House of Romay can be traced back to the beginning of The Reconquista”, in other words before the year 711.

Arms 

The first record of the Romay heraldic arms can be found in the fortress of Tras do Rio, in Frieiro, in the district of San Julian de Romay, Portas. As far as the armoury is concerned, the most ancient depiction dictates: «Coronet: That of a Lord. Crest: in a silver field a Lion Rampant Gules, under whose claws two Fig Leaves Saber and an ‘M' Gules under a Comital Coronet Or”.

See also 
 Grandee
 Spanish nobility
 Hidalgo (Spanish nobility)
 Fidalgo

References

External links 
 Diputación de la Grandeza de España 
 Registro de los Grandes de España:. (in Spanish)
 Dinastía de Cantabia (1a Línea) (in Spanish)
 Romay en Betanzos (in Spanish)

Spanish noble families